Chlosyne palla, the northern checkerspot, is a butterfly of the family Nymphalidae that is found in North America. They range from southern British Columbia to Alberta, south to California, Utah, and Colorado, excluding Nevada.

Description
The adult may be often confused with the others of the palla group, sagebrush checkerspot (C. acastus) and Hoffmann's checkerspot (C. hoffmanni). The upperside of the wing has a pattern of dark brown, light orange and tan. The underside of the wing has alternating red and yellow cells.

Life cycle
There is one flight that occurs between April and May or to July in mountainous or northerly areas.  The caterpillar of this species feeds on goldenrod (Solidago), rabbitbrush (Chrysothamnus), and asters.

References

External links
 Northern Checkerspot, BugGuide

Butterflies of North America
palla
Taxa named by Jean Baptiste Boisduval
Butterflies described in 1852